Ain't Misbehavin' is a 1979 album by Clark Terry, focusing on the music on Fats Waller. Terry is joined by pianist Oscar Peterson and the singer Johnny Hartman.

Track listing 
 "Jitterbug Waltz" (Richard Maltby, Jr., Fats Waller) – 5:41
 "Your Feet's Too Big" (Ada Benson, Fred Fisher) – 5:40
 "Honeysuckle Rose" (Andy Razaf, Waller) – 3:09
 "Mean to Me" (Fred E. Ahlert, Roy Turk) – 2:45
 "It's a Sin to Tell a Lie" (Billy Mayhew) – 4:10
 "Ain't Misbehavin'" (Harry Brooks, Razaf, Waller) – 3:05
 "Squeeze Me" (Waller, Clarence Williams) – 4:20
 "Handful of Keys" (Murrary Horwitz, Maltby, Waller) – 4:19
 "Black and Blue" (Brooks, Razaf, Waller) – 2:29
 "I Can't Give You Anything But Love" (Dorothy Fields, Jimmy McHugh) – 4:19
 "The Joint Is Jumpin'" (J. C. Johnson, Razaf, Waller) – 2:52

Personnel 
 Clark Terry – trumpet, flugelhorn, vocals
 Johnny Hartman – vocals
 Oscar Peterson – piano
 Victor Sproles – double bass
 Billy Hart – drums
 Chris Woods – flute, alto saxophone

References 

1979 albums
Clark Terry albums
Albums produced by Norman Granz
Fats Waller tribute albums
Pablo Records albums